Chayka Passage (‘Protok Chayka’ \'pro-tok 'chay-ka\) is the 1 km long in south-north direction and 110 m wide passage between Spert Island and the southwest coast of Trinity Island in the Palmer Archipelago, Antarctica. Its south entrance is situated just west of Bulnes Point. The vertical cliffs of Symplegades rise either side of the feature.

The passage is “named after the ocean fishing trawler Chayka of the Bulgarian company Ocean Fisheries – Burgas whose ships operated in the waters of South Georgia, Kerguelen, the South Orkney Islands, South Shetland Islands and Antarctic Peninsula from 1970 to the early 1990s.  The Bulgarian fishermen, along with those of the Soviet Union, Poland and East Germany are the pioneers of modern Antarctic fishing industry.”

Location
British mapping in 1978.

Maps
 British Antarctic Territory.  Scale 1:200000 topographic map. DOS 610 – W 63 60.  Tolworth, UK, 1978.
 Antarctic Digital Database (ADD). Scale 1:250000 topographic map of Antarctica. Scientific Committee on Antarctic Research (SCAR). Since 1993, regularly upgraded and updated.

Notes

References
 Chayka Passage. SCAR Composite Gazetteer of Antarctica.
 Bulgarian Antarctic Gazetteer. Antarctic Place-names Commission. (details in Bulgarian, basic data in English)

External links
 Chayka Passage. Copernix satellite image

Straits of the Palmer Archipelago
Ocean Fisheries – Burgas Co
Bulgaria and the Antarctic
Trinity Island